Haderslev Football Stadium is an association football stadium located in Haderslev, Denmark. It is the home ground of SønderjyskE. It has been known as Sydbank Park due to a sponsorship arrangement with the Danish bank Sydbank since December 2013. It was built in 2001 and has a capacity of 10,100 with 5,100 seatings. It has been renovated in 2013 by building a new stand of about 3.000 seats to respect the criteria of the  Danish Superliga, and again in 2018 and 2019 by expanding the eastern stands, and upgrading the north and south stands with roofs.

The south stand is a standing-only area for away fans. The north stand is a standing-only area for the singing home fans and the official supporters club. The east and west stands are seating only. The official supporters have a club house beneath the east stand. The stadium has four sky boxes in the west stand, and one sponsor lounge in the east stand. Two LED screens is able to show instant highlights, times and results.

References

External links 
Official homepage
Haderslev Fodboldstadion

Football venues in Denmark
SønderjyskE Fodbold
Buildings and structures in the Region of Southern Denmark
Buildings and structures in Haderslev Municipality
Haderslev